Stir-up Sunday is an informal term in Catholic and Anglican churches for the last Sunday before the season of Advent. It gets its name from the beginning of the collect for the day in the Book of Common Prayer, which begins with the words, "Stir up, we beseech thee, O Lord, the wills of thy faithful people".  But it has become associated with the custom of making the Christmas puddings on that day.  The Christmas pudding is one of the essential British Christmas traditions and is said to have been introduced to Britain by Prince Albert, husband of Queen Victoria (the reality is that the meat-less version was introduced from Germany by George I in 1714).  Most recipes for Christmas pudding require it to be cooked well in advance of Christmas and then reheated on Christmas Day, so the collect of the day served as a useful reminder.

Family activity
Traditionally, families gather together in the kitchen of their homes to mix and steam Christmas pudding on Stir-up Sunday. 
Parents teach their children how to mix ingredients for the pudding. Everyone takes a turn to stir the pudding mix for each person involved is able to make a special wish for the year ahead. Practically, stirring the mixture is hard work, therefore as many as possible are involved. By tradition the pudding mixture is stirred from East to West in honour of the three wise men who visited the baby Jesus.

In some households, silver coins are added to the pudding mix. It is believed that finding a coin brings good luck.

In a 2013 survey, two-thirds of British children reported that they had never experienced stirring Christmas pudding mix, reflecting consumers' preference for ready-made puddings widely available in shops.

History and etymology

The term comes from the opening words of the collect for the day in the 1549 Book of Common Prayer and later (a translation of the Roman Missal's collect  used on the last Sunday before Advent):

In the Book of Common Prayer and later editions, this collect is listed for "The Twenty-Fifth Sunday After Trinity", with a rubric specifying that this collect "shall always be used upon the Sunday next before Advent". This reinforced the significance of this day as forming part of the preparation for the season of Advent. The rubric is necessary because the last Sunday before Advent does not always fall on the twenty-fifth Sunday after Trinity: Trinity Sunday is a moveable feast and the Advent season is fixed, so the number of weeks in between varies from year to year.

Thus, this collect was always read just before Advent - as it in the (pre-reform) Roman Missal whence it came (where the Sunday is called the "24th Sunday after Pentecost", but the Sundays left out after Epiphany are "caught-up" between the 23rd and the 24th, making it always the last before Advent). Since most recipes for Christmas pudding call for the pudding to be kept for several weeks to mature, the day subsequently became connected, in countries which used the Book of Common Prayer, with the preparation of Christmas puddings in readiness for Christmas. Supposedly, cooks, wives and their servants would go to church, hear the words "Stir up, we beseech thee, O Lord ...", and be reminded, by association of ideas, that it was about time to start stirring up the puddings for Christmas.

In recent years most provinces of the Anglican Communion have adopted the practice of the Roman Catholic Church in observing this Sunday as Christ the King (sometimes under the name "The Reign of Christ").  Popular attachment to the "Stir up" collect has, however, caused it to be retained (in contemporary language) in the liturgies of several provinces. The Church of England's "Common Worship" uses it as the Post-Communion prayer, with a rubric stating that it "may be used as the Collect at Morning and Evening Prayer during this week".

In the Catholic Ordinariates for former Anglicans, Divine Worship: The Missal appoints the "stir up" collect for use on any of the weekdays between the Solemnity of Christ the King which are not themselves Feasts or Obligatory Memorials.  The Collect thus functions as the Collect for the Sunday Next Before Advent, even though the Sunday with that title is now a liturgical fiction always being impeded by the higher ranking Solemnity of Christ the King. Yet the fictional Sunday nonetheless provides the real Collect for the following weekdays, as in other weeks in the calendar where a Sunday is occasionally impeded by a higher ranking Feast. The collect thus continues to be used the week before Advent, and thereby ensures that cooks will still be reminded to stir up their Christmas pudding in time, as long as they attend Daily Mass or read the Daily Office on at least one of the unimpeded days during the week. In addition, one of the two choices in Divine Worship: The Missal for the Collect for the Second Sunday in Advent begins with the words, "Stir up our hearts, O Lord." The other collect option on the Second Sunday in Advent is the more famous "Read, mark, learn, and inwardly digest" collect, which some pastors are likely to prefer. But Christmas pudding is important, and yet another possibility for reminding the cooks was provided: the Collect for Ember Friday in Advent, which in the Ordinariates occurs on the Friday in the first week of Advent, begins "Stir up, we beseech thee, O Lord, thy power."

In the Episcopal Church in the United States, the collect appointed for the Third Sunday of Advent in the Book of Common Prayer (1979) begins with the phrase "stir up your power O Lord." Thus, in many Episcopal Churches, the Third Sunday of Advent, also known as Gaudete Sunday, is referred to as "Stir-up Sunday." Marion J. Hatchett in his definitive work "Commentary on the American Prayer Book," notes that in the Pre-Reformation English Sarum Rite, collects for four of the last five Sundays before Christmas began with the word "excita" or "stir up." A similar collect to the one appointed in the BCP 1979 appears in the recent book authorized for use in the Church of England, "Common Worship", appointed for the Second Sunday of Advent, but the phrase "raise up" is used instead.

Dates
2020: 22 November
2021: 21 November
2022: 20 November
2023: 26 November
2024: 24 November

See also

Advent Sunday
Gaudete Sunday
Totensonntag

References

External links
Stir Up Sunday
Christmas pudding’s Stir Up Sunday – Head Chef Rob Kirby
Stir Up Sunday at CatholicCulture.org

Advent
Anglicanism
English folklore
Christian Sunday observances
November observances